ONE Friday Fights 3: Chorfah vs. Petsukumvit (also known as ONE Lumpinee 3) was a combat sport event produced by ONE Championship that took place on February 3, 2023, at Lumpinee Boxing Stadium in Bangkok, Thailand.

Background 
A flyweight muay thai bout between Chorfah Tor.Sangtiennoi and Phetsukumvit Boibangna served as the event headliner.

Results

Bonus awards 
The following fighters received $10,000 bonuses.
Performance of the Night: Elbrus Amirkhanovich, Kongchai Chanaidonmuang, Ilyas Musaev, Yu Yau Pui, Shannon Wiratchai and Alisson Barbosa

See also 

 2023 in ONE Championship
 List of ONE Championship events
 List of current ONE fighters

References 

Events in Bangkok
ONE Championship events
2023 in mixed martial arts
Mixed martial arts in Thailand
Sports competitions in Thailand
February 2023 sports events in Thailand